Zenas is an unincorporated community in Columbia Township, Jennings County, Indiana.

History
Zenas was platted in 1837, and was likely named after a figure in the Epistle to Titus. A post office was established at Zenas in 1839, and remained in operation until it was discontinued in 1911.

Geography

References

Unincorporated communities in Jennings County, Indiana
Unincorporated communities in Indiana